Paolo Fornaciari (born 2 February 1971 in Viareggio, Province of Lucca) is a former Italian professional road bicycle racer.
Fornaciari retired at the end of the 2008 season.

Major results

1993
2nd Milano–Torino
3rd Overall Settimana Internazionale di Coppi e Bartali
1994
1st Stage 10 Herald Sun Tour
1995
3rd Trofeo Pantalica
1996
2nd G.P. Camaiore
1997
2nd E3 Prijs Vlaanderen
10th Trofeo Laigueglia
1999
9th Overall Settimana Internazionale di Coppi e Bartali

Notes and references

External links 
Personal website
Profile at Lampre-Fondital official website

1971 births
Living people
People from Viareggio
Italian male cyclists
Cyclists from Tuscany
Sportspeople from the Province of Lucca